Alf Gowart Olsen (30 June 1912 – 17 October 1972) was a Norwegian ship owner and ship broker. He was born in Stavanger, Norway. He chaired the family shipping company Brødrene Olsen from 1932. He was a board member of several companies and foundations, including Det Stavangerske Dampskibsselskap, Stavanger Flint, Stavanger Maritime Museum and the Norwegian Shipowners' Association. He was decorated Knight of the Order of the Netherlands Lion.

References

1912 births
1972 deaths
People from Stavanger
Norwegian businesspeople in shipping
Knights of the Order of the Netherlands Lion